Shasta traditional narratives include myths, legends, tales, and oral histories preserved by the Shasta people (including the Konomihu and Okwanuchu) of northern California and southern Oregon.

Introduction
Shastan oral literature reflects the position of the group in an area where cultural influences converged from several different regions, including central California, Pacific Northwest, Plateau, and Great Basin. (See also Traditional narratives (Native California).)

Online examples of Shasta narratives
 "Indian Myths of South Central California" by Alfred L. Kroeber (1907)
 Myths and Legends of California and the Old Southwest by Katharine Berry Judson (1912)
 The North American Indian by Edward S. Curtis (1924)

See also
Shastan languages

References

Sources for Shasta narratives
 Clark, Ella E. 1953. Indian Legends of the Pacific Northwest. University of California Press, Berkeley. (Includes a Flood myth published by Dixon (1910), pp. 11–12.)
 Curtis, Edward S. 1907-1930. The North American Indian. 20 vols. Plimpton Press, Norwood, Massachusetts. (Seven myths collected from Indian Jake, vol. 13, pp. 201–206.)
 Dixon, Roland B. 1905. "The Mythology of the Shasta-Achomawi". American Anthropologist 7:607-612. (Comparative notes.)
 Dixon, Roland B. 1910. "Shasta Myths". Journal of American Folklore 23:8-37. (31 myths, including Theft of Fire, Orpheus, and Loon Woman.)
 Erdoes, Richard, and Alfonso Ortiz. 1984. American Indian Myths and Legends. Pantheon Books, New York. (Retelling of a narrative from Gifford and Block 1930, pp. 356–357.)
 Ferrand, Livingston. 1910. "Shasta and Athapascan Myths from Oregon". Edited by Leo J. Frachtenberg. Journal of American Folklore 28:207-242. (15 Shasta myths, including Theft of Fire and Loon Woman, collected in 1900.)
 Gifford, Edward Winslow, and Gwendoline Harris Block. 1930. California Indian Nights. Arthur H. Clark, Glendale, California. (Eleven previously published narratives, pp. 124–125, 139-141, 162-164, 171-174, 189-190, 201-203, 226-227, 269-273, 278-280, 301.)
 Graves, Charles S. 1929. Lore and Legends of the Klamath River Indians. Press of the Times, Yreka, California. (Includes Yurok, Karok, and Shasta narratives.)
 Holt, Permelia Catharine. 1942. The Relations of Shasta Folk Lore.  Unpublished Ph.D. dissertation, Department of Anthropology, University of California, Berkeley.
 Holsinger, Rosemary. 1982. Shasta Indian Tales.  Naturegraph, Happy Camp, California.
 Judson, Katharine Berry. 1912. Myths and Legends of California and the Old Southwest. A. C. McClurg, Chicago. (Three myths, pp. 27–28, 37-38, 55-57.)
 Kroeber A. L. 1907. "Indian Myths of South Central California". University of California Publications in American Archaeology and Ethnology 4:167-250. Berkeley. (Comparative notes, pp. 179–181.)
 Kroeber, A. L. 1925. Handbook of the Indians of California. Bureau of American Ethnology Bulletin No. 78. Washington, D.C. (Brief comparative comments, pp. 283, 304.)
 Powers, Stephen. 1877. Tribes of California. Contributions to North American Ethnology, vol. 3. Government Printing Office, Washington, D.C. Reprinted with an introduction by Robert F. Heizer in 1976, University of California Press, Berkeley. (Several narratives, including Theft of Fire, pp. 250–251.)
 Ramsey, Jarold. 1977. Coyote Was Going There: Indian Literature of the Oregon Country. University of Washington Press, Seattle. (Theft of Fire myth previously published by Dixon, pp. 216–217.)
 Silver, Shirley, and Clara Wicks. 1977. "Coyote Steals the Fire (Shasta)".  In Northern Californian Texts, edited by Victor Golla and Shirley Silver, pp. 121–131.  International Journal of American Linguistics Native American Texts Series No. 2(2). University of Chicago Press.
 Thompson, Stith. 1929. Tales of the North American Indians. Harvard University Press, Cambridge, Massachusetts. (Loon Woman narrative, pp. 196–197, from Farrand 1915.)
 Voegelin, Erminie W. 1947. "Three Shasta Myths, Including 'Orpheus'". Journal of American Folklore 60:52-58. (Collected in 1936 from Rogue River Shasta informant Sargeant Sambo; comparisons with other Shasta and Karok versions.)

Shasta people
Traditional narratives (Native California)